Stephen Brown (born January 6, 1969) is a retired athlete from Trinidad and Tobago who specialized in the 110 metres hurdles. He represented his birth country United States until 1997.

Brown attended the Wake Forest University in Winston-Salem, North Carolina, where he was a member of both the football and track teams. He won four Atlantic Coast Conference (ACC) track titles, including two in the 110 meter outdoor hurdles, and was a four-year starter in football, recording 122 career receptions. Brown was inducted into the Wake Forest Sports Hall of Fame in 2009, and was also named to the ACC's 50th Anniversary Men's Outdoor Track and Field team.

Achievements

References

External links
 
 Best of Trinidad
 Wake Forest Names 5 to Sports Hall of Fame

1969 births
Living people
American football wide receivers
American male hurdlers
Trinidad and Tobago male hurdlers
Athletes (track and field) at the 1998 Commonwealth Games
Athletes (track and field) at the 1999 Pan American Games
Athletes (track and field) at the 2000 Summer Olympics
Central American and Caribbean Games medalists in athletics
Central American and Caribbean Games silver medalists for Trinidad and Tobago
Commonwealth Games medallists in athletics
Commonwealth Games silver medallists for Trinidad and Tobago
Competitors at the 1998 Central American and Caribbean Games
Olympic athletes of Trinidad and Tobago
Pan American Games competitors for Trinidad and Tobago
Wake Forest Demon Deacons football players
Wake Forest Demon Deacons men's track and field athletes
Medallists at the 1998 Commonwealth Games